Matt Wheeler (also known as Matt JL Wheeler) is a British screenwriter and producer who has worked in television and film.

Education 
Wheeler graduated from Cambridge University with a degree in English literature, before attending the UCLA School of Theater, Film and Television where he gained an MFA in screenwriting. He was awarded the BAFTA scholarship, and in addition to winning the 2010 UCLA showcase competition, he was also granted the prestigious Samuel Goldwyn Award.

Works 
Wheeler adapted "The Informant" for Sony (based on the Thomas Perry novel) and "Tin Men" for Warner Brothers as well as writing the screenplay for the 2016 film Who Gets the Dog?, starring Alicia Silverstone.

In 2015, he joined CBS's Hawaii Five-0, where he worked for five seasons, with writing credits on 32 episodes. For seasons 9 and 10, Wheeler was a co-showrunner. Wheeler wrote the pilot and co-created the summer event series, Salvation, which premiered on CBS on 12 July 2017.

References

External links
 

Year of birth missing (living people)
Living people
21st-century British screenwriters
British film producers
British television writers
British male screenwriters
British science fiction writers
UCLA Film School alumni
Selwyn College, Cambridge
BAFTA winners (people)